Vetle is a masculine Norwegian given name and may refer to:

Vetle Andersen (born 1964), Norwegian footballer
Vetle Vinje (born 1962), Norwegian rower
Vetle Vislie (1858–1933), Norwegian educator and writer

See also
Vetle Skagastølstind, mountain in Norway

Norwegian masculine given names